John McLachlan (1840 – 11 September 1915) was a New Zealand Member of Parliament for Ashburton in the South Island.

Early life
McLachlan was born in Ardrossan, Ayrshire, Scotland, in 1840. He learned his father's trade as a plasterer. He came to New Zealand in 1863 by the ship Sebastopol and arrived at Lyttelton. After some time spent in looking around the country, he chose land near Lake Ellesmere / Te Waihora and became a farmer.

His brothers, sister and his mother followed him to New Zealand.

Member of Parliament

McLachlan stood for election in the Selwyn electorate for the Canterbury Provincial Council, but lost to Edward Jollie.

He represented the Ashburton electorate in the House of Representatives for twelve years (–1896; –1908).

He was a colourful character in Parliament.

"The representative of Ashburton", wrote a newspaper reporter, "is about the wildest looking specimen in the Parliamentary collection. But if he is in the rough to gaze on, he can give 'points' to some more ornamental members in the matter of ability and originality of thought and expression. He is a sturdily built, carelessly dressed man, with a large head, made to look larger by the wild disorder of a huge shock of curly hair. He is a farmer and might have stepped out of his market trap into his place in the House. He is, as a rule, a breezy, happy-go-lucky sort of member with a good sense of humour and a fine stock of anecdotes and a great admiration for and acquaintance with the writings of Robert Burns."

He was a leading Canterbury Presbyterian, and was known for his love of whisky. On occasions he spoke on the platform or in the house while intoxicated and made a fool of himself, and in 1894 he fell into Wellington Harbour when he mistook the lights of a ship for the lights outside a chemist's shop where he had lodgings. In 1907 he was 'almost certainly' the subject of a complaint by J. T. Marryat Hornsby to the Speaker about his language and his intoxicated condition in the house, which the Premier promised to have put right.

Family and death
John McLachlan died on 11 September 1915. His son Alexander McLachlan (1870–1945) was a farmer and mill owner and Labour candidate for Mataura at the 1919 election. Archibald Albany McLachlan (1898–1961), a solicitor from Christchurch, was a grandson of John McLachlan.

Notes

References

 This article incorporates text from a publication now in the public domain: 

1840 births
1915 deaths
New Zealand Liberal Party MPs
Members of the New Zealand House of Representatives
New Zealand farmers
Scottish emigrants to New Zealand
New Zealand MPs for South Island electorates
People from Ashburton, New Zealand
Unsuccessful candidates in the 1890 New Zealand general election
Unsuccessful candidates in the 1896 New Zealand general election
Unsuccessful candidates in the 1887 New Zealand general election
19th-century New Zealand politicians